The New Tradition is the California Barbershop quartet that won the 1985 SPEBSQSA international competition.  The name refers to an earlier quartet, the Grand Tradition, with the same lead and baritone.  It is not to be confused with the New Tradition Chorus from Northbrook, Illinois.

Discography
 Clowning Around LP, cassette, re-release CD
 TNT Dynamite LP, cassette, re-release CD
 Magical History Tour (Sgt. Pepler's Homely Tarts Pub Band), double CD
The New Tradition - AIC Masterworks CD (CD; 2008)

References
 Discography Mike Barkley's Monster list
 AIC entry

Barbershop quartets
Barbershop Harmony Society